William Alexander Searcey, known professionally as Bill Searcey, (March 3, 1958 – March 8, 2021) was an American offensive guard for the San Diego Chargers. Born in Savannah, Georgia, he attended Benedictine Military School. He attended college at the University of Alabama and played college football with the Alabama Crimson Tide. He started his career with the Birmingham Stallions in 1983 and then played for the Houston Gamblers. He made his NFL debut in the 1985 season, only appearing in one game during his career. He died on March 8, 2021, due to pancreatic cancer, days after his 63rd birthday. He is survived by his widow, Karen Searcey.

References

1958 births
2021 deaths
American football offensive guards
Alabama Crimson Tide football players
San Diego Chargers players
Players of American football from Savannah, Georgia